Beechwood (Isaac Kinsey House) is a historic home an farm located in Washington Township, Wayne County, Indiana. It was built in 1871, and is a two-story, Italianate style brick dwelling with a hipped roof topped by a cupola. It features a semicircular stone arched main entry surrounded by a two-story, wrought iron verandah and projecting two-story semi-hexagonal bay.  Also on the property are the contributing dairy house, smokehouse, granary, barn, cow shed, and carriage house.

It was added to the National Register of Historic Places in 1975.

References

External links

Historic American Buildings Survey in Indiana
Farms on the National Register of Historic Places in Indiana
Houses on the National Register of Historic Places in Indiana
Italianate architecture in Indiana
Houses completed in 1871
Buildings and structures in Wayne County, Indiana
National Register of Historic Places in Wayne County, Indiana